Phillipps Peak is located on the border of Alberta and British Columbia on the Continental Divide. It was named in 1915 after Michael Phillipps who in 1873 was the first white man to cross Crowsnest Pass. It is the lower west peak of Mount Tecumseh.

Geology
Phillipps Peak is composed of sedimentary rock laid down during the Precambrian to Jurassic periods.

Climate
Based on the Köppen climate classification, Phillipps Peak has an alpine subarctic climate with cold, snowy winters, and mild summers. Temperatures can drop below −20 °C with wind chill factors below −30 °C.

See also
 List of peaks on the Alberta–British Columbia border
 Mountains of Alberta
 Mountains of British Columbia

References

Phillipps Peak
Phillipps Peak
Canadian Rockies